Norma Esparza Herrera (born 23 November 1967) is a Mexican politician affiliated with the PRI. She served as Senator of the LXI Legislature of the Mexican Congress representing Aguascalientes.

References

1967 births
Living people
People from Aguascalientes City
Members of the Senate of the Republic (Mexico)
Institutional Revolutionary Party politicians
21st-century Mexican politicians